José Luis Uribezubia (born 21 August 1945) is a Spanish former racing cyclist. He rode in three editions of the Tour de France, as well as seven editions of the Vuelta a España and three of the Giro d'Italia.

Major results

1967
 1st Overall Vuelta a Aragón
 1st Clásica a los Puertos de Guadarrama
 3rd GP Villafranca de Ordizia
 3rd Overall Gran Premio de la Bicicleta Eibarresa
1972
 6th Overall Tour of the Basque Country
 9th Overall Vuelta a Andalucía
1973
 9th Overall Tour of the Basque Country
1974
 6th Trofeo Masferrer
 8th Overall Vuelta a España
1st Stage 11
1975
 1st GP Llodio
 7th Klasika Primavera
1976
 1st Overall Vuelta a los Valles Mineros
1st Stage 2
 9th Overall Paris–Nice

References

1945 births
Living people
Spanish male cyclists
Sportspeople from Biscay
Spanish Vuelta a España stage winners
Cyclists from the Basque Country (autonomous community)
People from Durangaldea